El Chavo Animado (El Chavo: The Animated Series in English) is a Mexican animated series based on the live action television series El Chavo del Ocho, created by Roberto Gómez Bolaños, produced by Televisa and Ánima Estudios. It aired on Canal 5, and repeats were also shown on Las Estrellas and Cartoon Network Latin America. 134 episodes aired between 2006 and 2014 and starts a hiatus.

After several years of successful repeats of the original series, on 21 October 2006 Televisa launched in Mexico and the rest of Latin America an animated version of the program by Ánima Estudios to capitalise on the original series' popularity. With the series, Televisa began a marketing campaign which included merchandise tie-ins. For the series' launch event, a set was built (imitating the computerised background) on which the animation was said. Many elements of the original series, including most of the original stories, were included in the animated series.

El Chavo Animado also aired in English via Kabillion's on-demand service in the USA. Although it was part of the video-on-demand service, the series did not appear on the Kabillion website until the site's April 2012 relaunch. The series is currently airing on bitMe and Distrito Comedia as of 2020 and in 2016 - 2017 and as of 2022, It aired on Galavisión along with El Chapulín Colorado Animado.

Premise

Background 
The cartoon depicts the children to scale, compared to the live-action series where the children were played by adults. This was not the first attempt to animate the show's characters; claymation sequences were created for the original-series credits during the late 1970s, and 2D animations were used for the credits of Chespirito (the program which succeeded El Chavo and its sister series, El Chapulín Colorado).

Synopsis 
Based on the series El Chavo del Ocho, the cartoon is the adventures of El Chavo, a poor boy, and his gang, who live in a village in Mexico (the Brazilian dubbing, however, moved the village's location to Brazil and in Kabillion's dub, to New York City). In the first season, all episodes of the series are remakes of episodes from the original series. With the absence of La Chilindrina, Ñoño, Popis and Quico (in school episodes) replace her role in most episodes. From the second season, the cartoon began to have episodes with original stories.

Characters 

El Chavo Animado features all the characters of the original series, with the exception of La Chilindrina due to ownership disputes. The series stars El Chavo, a poor boy, along with his gang, which consists of Quico, the exhibitionist and protected son of Doña Florinda, and Ñoño, a fat boy which is Mr. Barriga's son.

Cast

Spanish
 Jesús Guzmán as El Chavo, Godínez
 Sebastián Llapur as Quico and Señor Barriga (seasons 5 - 7)
 Mario Castañeda as Don Ramón, Ñoño
 Erica Edwards as Doña Florinda, La Popis
 Juan Carlos Tinoco (seasons 1-2) and Moisés Suárez Aldana (seasons 3-7) as Profesor Jirafales
 Erika Mireles as Doña Clotilde (La Bruja del 71)
 Víctor Delgado (seasons 1-5) as Señor Barriga
 Maggie Vera as Paty
 Leonardo García (seasons 1-5) and Hector Miranda (seasons 6-7) as Jaimito el Cartero
 Julieta Rivera as Gloria

English
Mona Marshall as Chavo, Miss Pinster (The Witch of 71)
Doug Erholtz as Quico, Mr. Raymond, Captain Hopper
Kate Higgins as Mrs. Worthmore, Gordon, Phoebe 
Erin Fitzgerald as Gordon, Phoebe 
Yuri Lowenthal as Junior 
Tara Platt as Gloria, Patty
Bob Buchholz as Professor Girafalde

English dub
The series was dubbed into 52 English episodes and aired in Kabillion's video-on-demand, with some changes. The theme song and most of the character names were changed, but the original theme song can be heard during the credits of nearly every episode. Spanish cuisine was Americanised, and the setting changed from Mexico to New York City. Episode titles were changed to idiomatic English.

US names
Chavo, Gloria and Quico are the only characters whose names have never been Americanised or changed. Although Paty's name sounds the same, the US version adds another "t" to the name.

Don Ramón - Mr. Raymond
Doña Florinda - Mrs. Worthmore
Professor Jirafales - Professor Girafalde
Doña Cleotilde, La bruja del 71 - Miss Pinster, The Witch of 71
Señor Barriga - Mr. Beliarge
Jaimito el cartero - Manny the Mailman
La Popis - Phoebe
Ñoño - Junior
Godínez - Gordon
Paty - Patty
El Chapulín Colorado - Captain Hopper
Señor Hurtado - Mr. Crookley
Serafina - Stephanie
El Justiciero Enmascarado - The Secret Masked Crusader
La Rubia Margot - Margot Blonde
Panfilo - The Baby
Vicente/Chente - Chova
Rufino Malacara - Ruffino Meanface

Episode list

Season 1 (2006–2007)
The original title is in the original Spanish version, which aired on Canal 5. The English title is the American English version, which aired on Kabillion, the Portuguese title is for the Brazilian Portuguese version.

Season 2 (2007–2008)
This was the last English-dubbed season.

Season 3 (2009–2010)

Season 4 (2010–2011)

Season 5 (2012)

Season 6 (2013)

Season 7 (2014)

Telecast
The show was aired on Canal 5, and repeats were also shown on Las Estrellas and Cartoon Network Latin America. 134 episodes aired between 2006 and 2014 and starts a hiatus.

El Chavo Animado also aired in English via Kabillion's on-demand service in the USA. Although it was part of the video-on-demand service, the series did not appear on the Kabillion website until the site's April 2012 relaunch. The series is currently airing on bitMe and Distrito Comedia as of 2020.

Spin-offs and merchandise
Televisa released six episodes of El Chavo in Mexico in 2007. The same collection was released by Universal Video Entertainment in Brazil in 2008 as Chaves em Desenho Animado. Quico, La Popis (Phoebe), Don Ramón (Mr. Raymond), Doña Florinda (Mrs. Worthmore) and Professor Jirafales (Professor Girafalges) dolls were marketed in Mexico in 2004.

Video games
A video game based on the series was developed by Kaxan Media Group and released in Mexico on 27 April 2012 for the Wii by Slang Publishing and Televisa Home Entertainment. La Vecindad de El Chavo (a Facebook social-network game) was released in March 2012 by Playful Play, a game development company in Monterrey, Mexico. By 3 October 2012, the game had three million registered players. It closed on 4 August 2014. In 2014, El Chavo Kart was released for the Xbox 360, PlayStation 3, and Android. However, the Android version has since been delisted from the Google Play Store. In 2014, another game was released exclusively on Android, titled El Chavo: A Carnival in the Apartments. It was developed by Blue River SA. In this game, a carnival is taking place in the housing complex, and we can play minigames to win tickets to get powerups. The game was able to be played in Spanish, English (using the names from the Kabillion dub), and Brazilian Portuguese. However, the game has since been delisted from the Google Play Store.

El Chapulín Colorado Animado

After the success of El Chavo Animado, Televisa and Ánima Estudios developed an animated series based on El Chapulín Colorado (another show created by Roberto Gómez Bolaños). It premiered on veo.tv on 13 April 2015, and on television on 26 July of that year.

References

External links

 
 Ánima Estudios

El Chavo del Ocho
2006 Mexican television series debuts
2014 Mexican television series endings
2000s Mexican television series
2010s Mexican television series
2000s animated television series
Mexican children's animated comedy television series
Mexican flash animated television series
Ánima Estudios television series
Animated television series about orphans
Canal 5 (Mexico) original programming
Spanish-language television shows
Internet memes
Film and television memes